Members of the New South Wales Legislative Assembly who served in the 55th parliament held their seats from 2011 to 2015. They were elected at the 2011 state election and at by-elections. The Speaker was Shelley Hancock.

See also
O'Farrell ministry
First Baird ministry
Results of the 2011 New South Wales state election (Legislative Assembly)
Candidates of the 2011 New South Wales state election

References

Members of New South Wales parliaments by term
20th-century Australian politicians